This is a list giving breakdowns of the European Parliamentary session from 1994 to 1999.

MEPs for Austria 1996–1999
MEPs for Belgium 1994–1999
MEPs for Denmark 1994–1999
MEPs for Finland 1994–1999
MEPs for France 1994–1999
MEPs for Greece 1994–1999
MEPs for Germany 1994–1999
MEPs for Ireland 1994–1999
MEPs for Italy 1994–1999
MEPs for Luxembourg 1994–1999
List of members of the European Parliament for the Netherlands, 1994–1999
MEPs for Portugal 1994–1999
MEPs for Spain 1994–1999
MEPs for Sweden 1995
MEPs for Sweden 1995–1999
MEPs for the UK 1994–1999